Shirley Field may refer to:

People
 Shirley Anne Field, actress
 Shirley Adele Field, Oregon legislator and judge

Places
 Shirley Field (Tallulah, Louisiana) (National Register of Historic Places listings in Madison Parish, Louisiana)
 Shirley Field, Laredo, Texas, athletic stadium

Field, Shirley